The Family Allowances Act 1945 (8 & 9 Geo. VI c. 41) was a British Act of Parliament and was the first law to provide child benefit in the United Kingdom. It was enacted on 15 June 1945 when the caretaker Conservative government was in office under Winston Churchill, but it did not come into effect until 6 August 1946 when the Labour government under Clement Attlee was in power.

Family allowances had been one of the items proposed by the Beveridge Report in 1942. The Labour Party briefly debated pressing for allowances during the Second World War, but a party conference resolution to this end was opposed by the trades unions for fear that the amount paid would be taken into account in wage negotiations, leaving workers no better off.

As passed, the Act empowered the Minister of National Insurance to pay an allowance of five shillings per week for each child in a family other than the eldest; later Acts increased this sum. It was payable whilst the child was of school age, up to the age of eighteen, if apprenticed or in full-time school education.

See also
Child benefits in the United Kingdom

Notes

References

Further reading
Whitaker's Almanack: for the year 1958, p. 1127. J. Whitaker & Sons, London, 1957
Chronological Table of the Statutes 1253-1991. HMSO, London, 1993.
Emanuel Shinwell, The Labour Story, p. 167. Macdonald, London, 1963.

United Kingdom Acts of Parliament 1945
Social security in the United Kingdom